Eduardo Menezes (born 1 May 1980) is a Brazilian Olympic show jumping rider. He participated at the 2016 Summer Olympics in Rio de Janeiro, Brazil, where he finished 5th in the team jumping and 28th in the individual jumping competitions.

Menezes competed at the 2015 Pan American Games, finishing in 4th place teamwise and 9th individually. He also competed at the 2011 edition of the Show Jumping World Cup finals.

References 

1980 births
Living people
Equestrians at the 2015 Pan American Games
Equestrians at the 2019 Pan American Games
Equestrians at the 2016 Summer Olympics
Olympic equestrians of Brazil
Brazilian male equestrians
Pan American Games medalists in equestrian
Pan American Games gold medalists for Brazil
Medalists at the 2019 Pan American Games